Henry Alfred "Harry" Jenkins,  (born 18 August 1952) is a former Australian politician. He was a member of the House of Representatives from 1986 to 2013, representing the Australian Labor Party (ALP).

Jenkins served as the 26th Speaker of the House of Representatives, from 2008 until his unexpected resignation as Speaker on 24 November 2011.

Early life
Jenkins was born in Melbourne on 18 August 1952. He was the oldest of four children born to Hazel "Wendy" Winter and Henry Alfred Jenkins. His father, a physician, was elected to the House of Representatives in 1969.

Jenkins attended Ivanhoe Grammar School. He studied medicine at the University of Melbourne for three years, before switching to the Australian National University (ANU) where he completed a Bachelor of Science in 1976 with concentrations in human ecology, biology and biochemistry. After graduating he began working as an estimates officer with the Department of Veterans' Affairs. He was elected to the Whittlesea Shire Council in 1976 and served as shire president from 1984 to 1985.

Politics
Jenkins was president of the ALP's Bundoora branch in the 1980s. In 1985, his father resigned as Speaker to take up as an appointment as ambassador to Spain. Aged 33, Jenkins won ALP preselection for the resulting 1986 Scullin by-election ahead of former Casey MP Peter Steedman and future state government minister Theo Theophanous. He was described by the Canberra Times as "chosen as a compromise candidate by the old and new guards of Victoria's Socialist Left faction".

Jenkins was Deputy Speaker 1993–1996 and Second Deputy Speaker from 1996 to his election as Speaker in 2008. He was the Opposition candidate for Speaker after the 1996, 1998, 2001 and 2004 elections.

42nd Parliament
He was elected by Labor caucus on 29 November 2007 to become the Speaker of the House of Representatives in the 42nd Parliament.  This was carried by a formal vote on 12 February 2008.  He succeeded Liberal incumbent David Hawker.  Although Speakers normally carry the courtesy title while in office 'the Honourable', Jenkins said his personal preference was that it not be used.

He is the first speaker whose parent also held the post.

43rd Parliament
The Labor Party renominated Jenkins as Speaker in the 43rd Parliament, and he was elected unopposed when the Parliament opened on 28 September 2010.

On 31 May 2011, after a contentious debate on carbon pricing in which Jenkins declared a "general warning" for all members, Liberal MP Bob Baldwin interjected and was named by Jenkins. Baldwin was supported by the Coalition and by independent member Rob Oakeshott and West Australian National member Tony Crook. The resulting vote on suspending Baldwin for 24 hours failed 71–72. Convention would normally have required Jenkins to resign as Speaker, but the House of Representatives immediately thereafter approved a motion of confidence in the Speaker and he remained in the position.

He resigned as the Speaker of the House of Representatives on 24 November 2011, stating, "My desire is to be able to participate in policy and parliamentary debate, and this would be incompatible with continuing in the role of Speaker."

Jenkins retired from politics at the 2013 election.

References

External links
Harry Jenkins MP official site
Profile at the Parliament of Australia, and as Speaker
Appearances in Parliament at Open Australia

1952 births
Living people
Politicians from Melbourne
Australian public servants
Australian Labor Party members of the Parliament of Australia
Labor Left politicians
Members of the Australian House of Representatives for Scullin
Members of the Australian House of Representatives
Speakers of the Australian House of Representatives
Australian National University alumni
21st-century Australian politicians
20th-century Australian politicians
People educated at Ivanhoe Grammar School